William Clive Bridgeman, 1st Viscount Bridgeman, PC, JP, DL (31 December 1864 – 14 August 1935) was a British Conservative politician and peer. He notably served as Home Secretary between 1922 and 1924. He was also an active cricketer.

Background and education
Bridgeman was born in London, UK, the son of Reverend Hon. John Robert Orlando Bridgeman, third son of the 2nd Earl of Bradford, and Marianne Caroline Clive. He was educated at Eton and Trinity College, Cambridge. While there he was secretary of the Pitt Club.

Cricketing
While at Cambridge, he played first-class cricket for the Cambridge University Cricket Club. Below first-class he played at county level for Shropshire, appearing 31 times between 1884 and 1903, achieving a century in one match with 159 runs, while playing at club level for Worthen and for Blymhill in Staffordshire. In 1931 he served as President of the Marylebone Cricket Club.

Political career
Bridgeman entered a career in politics early, becoming assistant private secretary to Lord Knutsford, the Colonial Secretary (1889–1892), and then to Sir Michael Hicks-Beach, the Chancellor of the Exchequer from 1895 to 1897. In 1897 he became a member of the London School Board, and in 1904 he was elected to the London County Council. In 1906 he was elected as a member of parliament (MP) for Oswestry, staying in this seat until his retirement in 1929.  In 1909 he was appointed a member of a Royal Commission on the selection of Justices of the Peace.

In 1911, Bridgeman became an opposition whip, and became a government whip in the Asquith coalition government in 1915. From 1915 to 1916, he was Lord of the Treasury and Assistant Director of the War Trade Department. With the creation of Lloyd George's coalition in 1916, Bridgeman became Parliamentary Secretary to the Ministry of Labour until 1919, and then Parliamentary Secretary to the Board of Trade in 1919 and 1920, and then served as Secretary for Mines from 1920 to 1922. In these roles, Bridgeman became a devoted opponent of strikes and socialism, although he came to admire more moderate trade unionists. He was appointed to the Privy Council on 13 October 1920.

In October 1922, Bridgeman was one of the leaders of the Conservative revolt against the coalition's leadership, and he became Home Secretary in the new Conservative governments of Bonar Law and Stanley Baldwin from 1922 until January 1924. He developed here a reputation for harshness and resolve, which continued in his time as First Lord of the Admiralty from November 1924 to June 1929. Throughout, he was one of Conservative leader Stanley Baldwin's closest allies. Bridgeman retired from the Commons in 1929, and on 18 June that year was created Viscount Bridgeman, of Leigh in the County of Shropshire.

Later life
In his later years, he served as chairman of various commissions and committees, as well as, briefly, Chairman of the BBC. He became Justice of Peace and Deputy Lieutenant of Shropshire, and received an Honorary Doctor of Law from the University of Cambridge in 1930.

Family

Lord Bridgeman married Caroline Beatrix Parker, daughter of Hon. Cecil Thomas Parker and Rosamond Esther Harriet Longley, daughter of the Most Rev. Charles Thomas Longley, Archbishop of Canterbury, in Eccleston, Chester, on 30 April 1895. They had four children:	
Robert Bridgeman, 2nd Viscount Bridgeman (1896–1982)
Brigadier Hon. Geoffrey Bridgeman (1898–1974)
Anne Bridgeman (1900–1900)
Hon. Sir Maurice Bridgeman (1904–1980)

Lord Bridgeman died in Leigh Manor, Shropshire, on 14 August 1935, aged 70, and was buried in the churchyard at Hope near Minsterley three days later. The Viscountess Bridgeman died in December 1961.

References

Sources
 Williamson, Philip. The modernisation of conservative politics: the diaries and letters of William Bridgeman 1904-1935 (Historians' Press, 1988).

External links

1864 births
1935 deaths
BBC Governors
Conservative Party (UK) MPs for English constituencies
Deputy Lieutenants of Shropshire
English justices of the peace
First Lords of the Admiralty
Members of London County Council
Members of the Privy Council of the United Kingdom
People educated at Eton College
UK MPs 1906–1910
UK MPs 1910
UK MPs 1910–1918
UK MPs 1918–1922
UK MPs 1922–1923
UK MPs 1923–1924
UK MPs 1924–1929
UK MPs who were granted peerages
Viscounts in the Peerage of the United Kingdom
Members of the London School Board
William
Alumni of Trinity College, Cambridge
English cricketers
Cambridge University cricketers
Marylebone Cricket Club cricketers
Presidents of the Marylebone Cricket Club
Parliamentary Secretaries to the Board of Trade
People from Oswestry
Viscounts created by George V